The final of the men's artistic gymnastics team all-around competition at the 2012 Olympic Games was held at the North Greenwich Arena on 30 July. Eight teams of five gymnasts competed, from a total of twelve teams that had qualified for the Games.

The eight teams with the best combined scores in the qualification round moved on to the final. In the final, each team selected three gymnasts to compete on each apparatus. All scores were summed to give a final team score.

China won the gold medal with a total score of 275.997. In second place with 271.952 points was Japan, and Great Britain took bronze with 271.711.

Qualified teams

Final results

 Uchimura was initially given a score of 13.466 on the pommel horse. However, the Japanese team filed an appeal, believing that he had been given the incorrect D-score for his dismount. After review by the Men's Technical Committee, the dismount's difficulty was authorized and his score was raised to 14.166.

Controversy
Entering the last rotation of the final, China held the lead, followed by Japan, Ukraine, and Great Britain. Great Britain earned high scores on the floor exercise, allowing them to surpass Ukraine in the standings despite a solid rings programme from the Ukrainians. Meanwhile, however, Japan was encountering problems on its final apparatus, the pommel horse. First, Kazuhito Tanaka fell, earning a low score of 13.433. Then Kōhei Uchimura had a bad dismount and received a score of 13.466: knocking Japan down to fourth place, and moving Great Britain into second and Ukraine into third.

The Japanese team filed an appeal, arguing that Uchimura's difficulty score (D-score) had been incorrectly downgraded for his dismount, which—while executed poorly—was landed without a fall. After an in-depth video review by the Men's Technical Committee, headed by Adrian Stoica of Romania, Uchimura's dismount was given full difficulty credit (0.7 points for the G-level skill). This increased his total score to 14.166, giving Japan the silver medal and Great Britain the bronze, and knocking Ukraine to fourth place.

References

Men's artistic team all-around
2012
Olympics
Men's events at the 2012 Summer Olympics